The Global Digital Format Registry (GDFR) was a technical registry to support digital preservation services of Harvard University Libraries. The GDFR was begun in 2005, and is an example of an initiative exploring ways to create a sustainable data format registry.

References

External links
 harvard.edu GDFR 

Harvard Library
Organizations established in 2005
Preservation (library and archival science)